The Latobici or Latovici (Gaulish: Latobicoi) were a Celtic tribe dwelling in Pannonia Superior, around present-day Drnovo (Slovenia), during the Roman period.

Name 
They are mentioned as Latovici by Pliny (1st c. AD), as Λατόβικοι (Latóbikoi) by Ptolemy (2nd c. AD), and as Latobici on an inscription from Neviodunum (modern Drnovo) dated to 117–130 AD.

The ethnonym Latobici is a Latinized form of the Gaulish Latobicoi, which derives from the stem *lāto-, meaning 'furor, ardour' (cf. Old Irish láth, Welsh lawd), probably after the name of the Celtic god Latobios (*Lātu-biyos 'Furious Striker'). Pierre-Yves Lambert has proposed to translate Latobici as 'the lineage of Latobios'.

A homonym tribe, the Latobrigi (or Latobici), dwelled further northwest near the Helvetii. Whether they were actually related or even identical remains debated.

Geography 
The Latobici dwelled near the Krka river, around modern Drnovo, Trebnje, and Groblje pri Prekopi. Their territory was located north of the Golapiani, west of the Varciani, south of the Taurisci, east of the Rundictes. Inscriptions and shrines dedicated to the god Mars Latobius found in the catchment area of the Lavant river and the ridge of the Koralpe mountains may suggest that the Latobici originally lived around Virunum and Flavia Solva as late as the 1st century BC, from which they either extended their territory southward or emigrated to the region of Drnovo in Roman times.

During the reign of Augustus (27 BC–14 AD), a city-like settlement known as municipium Latobicorum (tribus Quirina) arose as a centre of the tribal area at the site of present-day Drnovo. It was called Neviodunum (Gaulish: 'new fortress') from the time of Vespasian (69–79 AD). Other settlements are known at Praetorium Latobicorum (modern Trebnje) and at Crucium (Groblje pri Prekopi).

References 

Bibliography

Historical Celtic peoples
Gauls
Ancient history of Slovenia